George Badger may refer to:

 George Edmund Badger (1795–1866), U.S. senator from the state of North Carolina
 George Percy Badger (1815–1888), English Anglican missionary and scholar of oriental studies

See also
 Badger (surname)